Howard Edwin "Ed" Reinecke (January 7, 1924 – December 24, 2016) was an American politician from California. He served three terms in the United States House of Representatives. He was the 39th state lieutenant governor from 1969 until his resignation in 1974 in connection with a Federal conviction for perjury.

Early life and career
Reinecke was born in Medford, Oregon and he graduated from Beverly Hills High School in 1942. He served in the Navy during World War II as a radioman. He attended the California Institute of Technology, from which he graduated in 1950 with a degree in mechanical engineering. Together with his sister (Charlotte) and two brothers (Fred and Bill), he founded FEBCO, a manufacturing company, in southern California.

Political career
Reinecke served in the U.S. House of Representatives between 1965 and 1969. As a member of the Interior Committee, he worked to preserve Western rivers (including the Colorado River, which was to be dammed within the Grand Canyon).

In 1969, President Richard Nixon appointed California's Lieutenant Governor Robert Finch to be the U.S. Secretary of Health, Education and Welfare. To fill the vacancy, Governor Ronald Reagan appointed then-Congressman Reinecke as Lieutenant Governor on January 9, 1969. He was re-elected in 1970.

In 1974, Reinecke ran for the Republican nomination for Governor of California to succeed Reagan, who chose not to seek a third term. As part of the conservative wing of the Republican Party in contrast with the more moderate State Controller Houston Flournoy, he could expect a strong conservative turnout for the primary election. Early in the race, he held a lead over Flournoy. He had just earned the endorsement of the California Republican Assembly, a leading conservative group, when a Federal grand jury indicted him for perjury on April 3, 1974.

Indictment and Conviction
Reinecke's indictment was an offshoot of the investigation into the Watergate scandal. In 1972, he testified before the Senate during a confirmation hearing of Richard Kleindienst, the nominee for Attorney General. He was asked about an offer by Sheraton Hotels, a division of ITT Inc., which was the subject of a Federal antitrust investigation, to underwrite the 1972 Republican National Convention. Specifically, the committee wanted to know if he discussed the offer with then Attorney General John N. Mitchell (R) during the Watergate scandal, before or after ITT settled its case with the government. Reinecke told Senator Hiram Fong that the conversation took place after the settlement despite his earlier comment to a reporter that the conversation had taken place several months earlier.

Reinecke stayed in the race for governor, but was defeated by Flournoy, who went on to lose to Jerry Brown (D) in the general election. He was convicted of perjury in July 1974, but refused to resign until the state law required him to do so.

California law barred anyone convicted of perjury from holding office in the state; but the state attorney general ruled that this provision would not take effect until sentencing.  On October 2, 1974, he was sentenced to an 18-month suspended term and resigned from office the same day.

On December 8, 1975, an appeals court overturned the ruling because "the Senate Judiciary Committee before which he was accused of perjuring himself had failed to publish its rule permitting a one-man quorum."

Later life

Reinecke and his wife, the former Jean Hrabec Mietus (1923–2011), a Pennsylvania native, owned the Diamond R Ranch on Bucks Bar Road in Placerville, California. They were the first ranchers to import and breed Charolais cattle in El Dorado County, California. In 1981, they opened the restaurant "Zachary Jacques" known for prime rib and live musical entertainment. They also operated the brokerage firm, Reinecke Realty Residential.

Reinecke died of natural causes on Christmas Eve 2016, in Laguna Hills, California, at the age of 92.

See also
List of Lieutenant Governors of California
List of American federal politicians convicted of crimes
List of federal political scandals in the United States

References

External links
Congressional biography
Video: Reinecke discusses drug trafficking

|-

1924 births
2016 deaths
20th-century Lutherans
American Lutherans
American perjurers
Beverly Hills High School alumni
California Institute of Technology alumni
California politicians convicted of crimes
California Republican Party chairs
Lieutenant Governors of California
Military personnel from Oregon
People from El Dorado County, California
People from Los Angeles
People from Rancho Mirage, California
Politicians from Medford, Oregon
Republican Party members of the United States House of Representatives from California
United States Navy sailors